John William Colenso (24 January 1814 – 20 June 1883) was a Cornish cleric and mathematician, defender of the Zulu and biblical scholar, who served as the first Bishop of Natal. He was a scholar of the Zulu language. In his role as an Anglican theologian, Colenso is now remembered for views of the Bible that set off intense controversy.

Early life and education
Colenso was born at St Austell, Cornwall, on 24 January 1814 the son of John William Colenso and Mary Ann Blackmore. His surname is Cornish and possibly originates from Colenso in the parish of St Hilary, near Penzance in West Cornwall. It is a place name from the  Cornish language Kelyn dhu, meaning "dark hollies". His father (John William Colenso) invested his capital into a mineral works in Pentewan, Cornwall, but the speculation proved to be ruinous when the investment was lost following a sea flood. His cousin William Colenso was a missionary in New Zealand.

Family financial problems meant that Colenso had to take a job as an usher in a private school before he could attend university. These earnings and a loan of £30 raised by his relatives paid for his first year at St John's College, Cambridge where he was a sizar.  Showing talent in mathematics, in 1836 he was Second Wrangler and Smith's Prizeman at the University of Cambridge, and in 1837 he became fellow of St John's. Two years later he went to Harrow School as mathematical tutor, but the step proved an unfortunate one. The school was at its lowest ebb, and Colenso not only had few pupils, but lost most of his property in a fire. He returned to Cambridge burdened by an enormous debt of £5,000. However, within a relatively short period he paid off this debt by diligent tutoring and the sale to Longmans of his copyright interest in the highly successful and widely read manuals he had written on algebra (in 1841) and arithmetic (in 1843).

Career
Colenso's early theological thinking was heavily influenced by F. D. Maurice to whom he was introduced by his wife and by Samuel Taylor Coleridge.

In 1846 he became rector of Forncett St Mary, Norfolk, and in 1853 he was recruited by the Bishop of Cape Town, Robert Gray, to be the first Bishop of Natal.

Life in Africa
Colenso was a significant figure in the history of the published word in 19th-century South Africa. He first wrote a short but vivid account of his initial journeying in Natal, Ten Weeks in Natal: A Journal of a First Tour of Visitation Among the Colonists and Zulu Kaffirs of Natal. Using the printing press he brought to his missionary station at Ekukhanyeni in Natal, and with William Ngidi he published the first Zulu Grammar and English/Zulu dictionary. His 1859 journey across Zululand to visit Mpande (the then Zulu King) and meet with Cetshwayo (Mpande's son and the Zulu King at the time of the Zulu War) was recorded in his book First Steps of the Zulu Mission. The same journey was also described in the first book written by native South Africans in Zulu – Three Native Accounts by Magema Fuze, Ndiyane and William Ngidi.  He also translated the New Testament and other portions of Scripture into Zulu.

Religious debate
Through the influence of his talented and well-educated wife, Sarah Frances Bunyon, Colenso became one of only a handful of theologians to embrace Frederick Denison Maurice, who was raised a Unitarian but joined the Church of England to help it "purify and elevate the mind of the nation". Before his missionary career Colenso's volume of sermons dedicated to Maurice signalled the critical approach he would later apply to biblical interpretation and the baleful impact on native Africans of colonial expansion in southern Africa.

Colenso first courted controversy with the publication in 1855 of his Remarks on the Proper Treatment of Polygamy; one of the most cogent Christian-based arguments for tolerance of polygamy.

Colenso's experiences in Natal informed his development as a religious thinker. In his commentary upon St Paul's Epistle to the Romans (1861) he countered the doctrine of eternal punishment and the contention that Holy Communion was a condition to salvation. He also questioned the presence of any Christian Church in Rome, stating - "Was there, in fact, any Christian Church at Rome at all, at this time, distinct and definitely marked off from the Jewish community? There would seem to have been none whatever..." Colenso, as a missionary, would not preach that the ancestors of newly Christianised Africans were condemned to eternal damnation.  The thought-provoking questions put to him by students at his missionary station encouraged him to re-examine the contents of the Pentateuch and the Book of Joshua and question whether certain sections of these books should be understood as literally or historically accurate. His conclusions, positive and negative, were published in a series of treatises on the Pentateuch and the Book of Joshua, from 1862 to 1879. The publication of these volumes created a scandal in England and were the cause of a number of anguished and patronising counter-blasts from those (clergy and laity alike) who refused to countenance the possibility of biblical fallibility. Colenso's work attracted the notice of biblical scholars on the continent such as Abraham Kuenen and played an important role in the development of Old Testament criticism in Britain.

Colenso's biblical criticism and his high-minded views about the treatment of African natives created a frenzy of alarm and opposition from the High Church party in South Africa and in England.  As controversy raged in England, the South African bishops headed by Bishop Robert Gray pronounced Colenso's deposition in December 1863. Colenso, who had refused to appear before this tribunal otherwise than by sending a proxy protest (delivered by his friend Wilhelm Bleek), appealed to the Judicial Committee of the Privy Council in London. The Privy Council eventually decided that the Bishop of Cape Town had no coercive jurisdiction and no authority to interfere with the Bishop of Natal. In view of this finding of ultra vires there was no opinion given upon the allegations of heresy made against Colenso.  The first Lambeth Conference was convened in 1867 to address concerns raised by the Privy Council's decision in favour of Colenso.

His adversaries, though unable to remove him from his episcopal office, succeeded in restricting his ability to preach both in Natal and in England.  Bishop Gray not only excommunicated him but consecrated a rival bishop (William Macrorie), who took the title of "Bishop of Maritzburg" (the latter a common name for Pietermaritzburg). The contributions of the missionary societies were withdrawn, but an attempt to deprive him of his episcopal income and the control of St Peter's Cathedral in Pietermaritzburg was frustrated by another court ruling. Colenso, encouraged by a handsome testimonial raised in England to which many clergymen subscribed, returned to his diocese. A rival cathedral was built but it has long been sold and moved. The new Cathedral of the Nativity, beside St Peter's, honours both Bishop Colenso and Bishop Macrorie in the names it has given to its halls.

Advocacy of native African causes

Colenso devoted the latter years of his life to further labours as a biblical commentator and as an advocate for native Africans in Natal and Zululand who had been unjustly treated by the colonial regime in Natal.  In 1874 he took up the cause of Langalibalele and the Hlubi and Ngwe tribes in representations to the Colonial Secretary, Lord Carnarvon. Langalibalele had been falsely accused of rebellion in 1873 and, following a charade of a trial, was found guilty and imprisoned on Robben Island.  In taking the side of Langalibalele against the Colonial regime in Natal and Theophilus Shepstone, the Secretary for Native Affairs, Colenso found himself even further estranged from colonial society in Natal.

Colenso's concern about the misleading information that was being provided to the Colonial Secretary in London by Shepstone and the Governor of Natal prompted him to devote much of the final part of his life to championing the cause of the Zulus against Boer oppression and official encroachments.  He was a prominent critic of Sir Bartle Frere's efforts to depict the Zulu kingdom as a threat to Natal.  Following the conclusion of the Anglo-Zulu War he interceded on behalf of Cetshwayo with the British government and succeeded in getting him released from Robben Island and returned to Zululand.

He was known as Sobantu (father of the people) to the native Africans in Natal and had a close relationship with members of the Zulu royal family; one of whom, Mkhungo (a son of Mpande), was taught at his school in Bishopstowe. After his death his wife and daughters continued his work supporting the Zulu cause and the organisation that eventually became the African National Congress.

Polygenism

Colenso was a polygenist; he believed in Co-Adamism, i.e. that races had been created separately. Colenso pointed to monuments and artefacts in Egypt to debunk monogenist beliefs that all races came from the same stock, i.e. from Adam and Eve. Ancient Egyptian representations of races, for example, showed exactly how the races looked today. Egyptological evidence indicated the existence of remarkable permanent differences in the shape of the skull, bodily form, colour and physiognomy between different races. Colenso believed that racial variation between races was so great, that it was impossible that all the races could have come from the same stock just a few thousand years ago. He was unconvinced that the climate could change racial variation. With other biblical polygenists, Colenso believed that monogenists had interpreted the Bible incorrectly.
Colenso said "It seems most probable that the human race, as it now exists, had really sprung from more than one pair." Colenso denied that polygenism caused any kind of racist attitudes or practices; like many other polygenists, he claimed that monogenesis was the cause of slavery and racism. Colenso claimed that each race had sprung from a different pair of parents, and that all races had been created as equals by God.

Later life and death

Colenso died at Durban, South Africa, on 20 June 1883. His daughter Frances Colenso (1849–1887) published two books on the relations of the Zulus to the British (History of the Zulu War and Its Origin in 1880 and The Ruin of Zululand in 1885) that explained recent events in Zululand from a pro-Zulu perspective.  His oldest daughter, Harriette Colenso (1847 – 1932), took up Colenso's mantle as advocate for the Zulus in opposition to their treatment by the authorities appointed by Natal, especially in the case of Dinizulu in 1888–1889 and in 1908–1909.

Personal life
Colenso married Sarah Frances Bunyon in 1846, and they had five children, Harriette Emily, Frances Ellen, Robert John, Francis "Frank" Ernest, and Agnes.  (In the marriage register, her name is spelt Bunyan. There had long been variations in the spelling of a surname that goes back at least to the 12th century in England and in Normandy.) Sarah's sister Harriette McDougall was a missionary.

In popular culture
 In the 1979 film Zulu Dawn, Colenso is sympathetically portrayed by Freddie Jones, as a principled critic of the decision to declare war on Cetshwayo and the Zulus.

Published works

 
 
 
 
 
 
 
  (The 1st and 2nd series of the Natal Sermons have been re-printed, but the 3rd and 4th series, published only in South Africa and extremely rare, have not yet been reprinted.)

References

Citations

Sources

 
 
 
 
 
 
 
   (Though somewhat hagiographical, Cox's work is of major importance, containing as it does many of Bishop Colenso's letters.)

Books written in response to Colenso's views on the Pentateuch

External links 

 Material relating to Colenso at Lambeth Palace Library
 
 
 

1814 births
1883 deaths
19th-century British mathematicians
19th-century translators
Alumni of St John's College, Cambridge
Anglican biblical scholars
Anglican bishops of Natal
British Anglican theologians
Christian Hebraists
Cornish Christian missionaries
British emigrants to South Africa
People excommunicated by the Church of England
People from St Austell
Second Wranglers
South African people of Cornish descent
Translators of the Bible into Zulu
Missionary linguists